KAHI (950 AM) is a radio station broadcasting a news/talk format. Licensed to Auburn, California, United States, the station serves the Auburn area.  The station is owned by Relevant Radio; the KAHI Corporation programs the station under a time brokerage agreement. KAHI is paired with expanded band station KSMH (1620 AM), which serves as Relevant Radio's Sacramento station.

Programming 

The station broadcasts locally produced programming, Oakland Athletics baseball, Sacramento Kings basketball, San Jose Sharks hockey, Sierra College and local high school football. When not carrying live broadcasts, KAHI carries nationally syndicated talk radio shows.

, the station produced several local programs that aired weekdays, including news blocks during drive time and in the noon hour, along with an evening talk show hosted by Mary Jane Popp.  The station's moniker then was "The Voice of the Foothills".

History

KAHI began broadcasting in 1957, originally licensed to Placer Broadcasters for 500 watts on 950 kHz, daytime-only.

Expanded Band assignment

On March 17, 1997, the Federal Communications Commission (FCC) announced that 88 stations had been given permission to move to newly available "Expanded Band" transmitting frequencies, from 1610 to 1700 kHz. KAHI was authorized to move to 1620 kHz, and in 1998 the expanded band station began broadcasting as KSMH.

The FCC's initial plan provided that both the original station and its expanded band counterpart could optionally operate simultaneously for up to five years, after which owners would have to turn in one of the two licenses, depending on whether they preferred the new assignment or elected to remain on the original frequency. However, this deadline has been extended numerous times, and both KAHI and KSMH have remained authorized. One restriction is that the FCC has generally required paired original and expanded band stations to remain under common ownership.

References

External links

 (covering 1957–1980)

AHI
News and talk radio stations in the United States
Auburn, California
Companies based in Placer County, California
Relevant Radio stations
Radio stations established in 1957
1957 establishments in California